Martin Gunnar Nag (30 July 1927 – 2 May 2015) was a Norwegian literary historian, literary critic, poet, essayist, translator and biographer. He was born in Stavanger.

He was a specialist on Slavic literature, and has translated Russian, Bulgarian and Czech literature into Norwegian language. Among his books are Uro, Rød lørdag from 1976 and Steingjerde from 1991. He has published works on Norwegian writers, such as Knut Hamsun, Sigbjørn Obstfelder, Rudolf Nilsen, Nordahl Grieg and Alexander Kielland, as well as Russian writers, including Dostoyevsky, Turgenev and Tolstoy. Not appointed to the academic position he desired, he was nonetheless a government scholar from 1987.

Nag issued his last book in the spring of 2015. He died in Oslo, Norway near the age of 88.

References

1927 births
2015 deaths
People from Stavanger
Norwegian literary historians
Slavists
Norwegian government scholars
20th-century Norwegian poets
21st-century Norwegian male writers
20th-century Norwegian historians
21st-century Norwegian historians
20th-century Norwegian male writers